This is a list of tennis players who have represented the United States Davis Cup team in an official Davis Cup match. The United States has taken part in the Davis Cup since 1901. Statistics correct as of 18 September 2017.

Players

References

Lists of Davis Cup tennis players
Davis